Luis Alberto Olcese (born 19 October 1981) is a Peruvian sailor. He competed in the Laser event at the 2000 Summer Olympics.

References

External links
 

1981 births
Living people
Peruvian male sailors (sport)
Olympic sailors of Peru
Sailors at the 2000 Summer Olympics – Laser
Sportspeople from Lima